Luigi Denza (24 February 1846 – 27 January 1922) was an Italian composer.

Career
Denza was born at Castellammare di Stabia, near Naples. He studied music with Saverio Mercadante and Paolo Serrao at the Naples Conservatory. In 1884, he moved to London, taught singing privately and became a professor of singing at the Royal Academy of Music in 1898, where he taught for two decades. He died in London in 1922.

Funiculì, Funiculà
Denza is best remembered for "Funiculì, Funiculà" (1880), a humorous Neapolitan song inspired by the inauguration of a funicular to the summit of Vesuvius. Neapolitan journalist Peppino Turco contributed the lyrics and may have prompted the song by suggesting that Denza compose something for the Piedigrotta song-writing competition. "Funiculì, Funiculà" was published the same year by Ricordi and within a year had sold a million copies.

Other music
In addition to "Funiculì, Funiculà", Denza composed hundreds of popular songs.  Some of them, such as "", "", and "", have been sung by Enrico Caruso, Mario Lanza, Carlo Bergonzi, Luciano Pavarotti, and Ronan Tynan. He was also an able mandolinist and guitarist, and for those instruments he wrote "Ricordo di Quisisana", "Come to me", "Nocturne", and several others.  Denza also wrote an opera, Wallenstein (1876).

Judging of James Joyce
Other than writing songs and music, Denza's enduring legacy was his judging of James Joyce, who was a singer before he became a world-famous novelist.

When Denza was Professor of Music at the London Academy of Music, he was asked to judge the 1904 Feis Ceoil Irish Singing Contest, a prototype of today's musical reality shows. On 16 May 1904, Denza attempted to mentor Joyce, and would have awarded him, the Gold Medal, but Joyce could not sight read, missing a crucial part of the competition; Denza instead awarded Joyce the third-place Bronze medal. Disgusted, Joyce gave the medal to his Aunt Josephine; the medal ended up years later being bought by Michael Flatley at an auction.

Notes

References

External links
 
 
 Luigi Denza (composer) in Discography of American Historical Recordings at UC Santa Barbara
 
 

1846 births
1922 deaths
19th-century classical composers
19th-century Italian male musicians
20th-century classical composers
20th-century Italian composers
20th-century Italian male musicians
Academics of the Royal Academy of Music
Italian classical composers
Italian classical mandolinists
Italian male classical composers
Italian opera composers
Italian Romantic composers
Male opera composers
People from Castellammare di Stabia